Antonio II Acciaioli was the Duke of Athens from 1439 to 1445.

He was a son of Francesco, Lord of Sykaminon, and Margareta Malpigli. Francesco was son of Donato; Donato was brother of Nerio I, Duke of Athens. Antonio II grew up in Florence until 1413, when his father's cousin Antonio I (son of Nerio I) called him and his brother Nerio II to Greece to live at his court. When the elder Antonio died in January 1435, he left the duchy to Nerio II under the regency of his widow Maria Melissene. However, Antonio forced Nerio from the city in January 1439. Antonio ruled energetically but briefly and died in 1445, to be replaced by his deposed brother.

Family
He married Maria Zorzi and had a child:
 Francesco II Acciaioli, Duke of Athens.

Notes

References
Setton, Kenneth M. (general editor) A History of the Crusades: Volume III — The Fourteenth and Fifteenth Centuries. Harry W. Hazard, editor. University of Wisconsin Press: Madison, 1975. 
Setton, Kenneth M. Catalan Domination of Athens 1311–1380. Revised edition. Variorum: London, 1975.

1445 deaths
Antonio 02
Dukes of Athens
Year of birth unknown
15th-century monarchs in Europe
15th-century Italian nobility